The 2007 Delta State gubernatorial election was the 4th gubernatorial election of Delta State. Held on April 14, 2007, the People's Democratic Party nominee Emmanuel Uduaghan won the election, defeating Great Ogboru of the Democratic People's Party.

Results 
Emmanuel Uduaghan from the People's Democratic Party won the election, defeating Great Ogboru from the Democratic People's Party. Registered voters was 1,626,930.

References 

Delta State gubernatorial elections
Delta gubernatorial
April 2007 events in Nigeria